Morice may refer to:
Persons
Adrien-Gabriel Morice (1859–1938), French priest and missionary to Canada; created a writing system for the Carrier language
Charles Morice (footballer) (1850–1932), English international footballer
Dave Morice (born 1946), American writer, visual artist, and performance artist
Francis David Morice (1849–1926), English entomologist and author
Francis Morice (1851–1912), New Zealand cricketer
Morice Baronets, any one of several baronets of the baronetcy of Devon, England
Morice Bird (1888–1933), English professional cricketer
Peter Morice (died 1588), Dutch or German engineer who built a pumped water supply system for the city of London
Pierre Morice (born 1962), French professional football player
Tara Morice (born 1964), Australian actress, singer, and dancer
William Morice (disambiguation), any one of several 16th- and 17th-century British baronets and MPs
Nicolas Morice, French Navy officer in the 19th century

Other
Morice Line, defensive line built in the 1950s to protect Algeria
Morice Range, mountain range in British Columbia, Canada
Morice River, British Columbia, Canada
Morice Town, Devon, England